Judith with the head of Holofernes is a 1610–1615 painting by the painter Carlo Saraceni, now held in the Kunsthistorisches Museum in Vienna.

The painting is typical of Saraceni's first decade in Rome where he became influenced by Caravaggio. His use of candlelight is illustrative of the chiaroscuro used by the tenebrists in this period. Another autograph copy is known in the Dayton Art Institute.

This painting was documented in David Teniers the Younger's catalog Theatrum Pictorium of the art collection of Archduke Leopold Wilhelm in 1659 and again in 1673, but the portrait had already enjoyed notoriety in Teniers' portrayals of the Archduke's art collection:

References 

 record on museum website
 39 in the catalog Theatrum Pictorium

1610s paintings
17th-century paintings
Paintings in the collection of the Kunsthistorisches Museum
Paintings in the collection of the Archduke Leopold Wilhelm of Austria
Paintings depicting Judith